Paul Capdeville and Nicolás Massú were the defending champions but decided not to participate.
Nicholas Monroe and Simon Stadler won the final 6–4, 6–4 against Renzo Olivo and Marco Trungelliti.

Seeds

Draw

Draw

References
 Main Draw

Seguros Bolivar Open Medellin - Doubles
2012 Doubles